The First Battle of Sirte was fought between the British Royal Navy and the Regia Marina (Italian Royal Navy) during the Mediterranean campaign of the Second World War. The engagement  took place on 17 December 1941, south-east of Malta, in the Gulf of Sirte. 

In the following days, two Royal Navy forces based at Malta ran into an Italian minefield off Tripoli and two British battleships were disabled by Italian manned torpedoes at Alexandria. By the end of December, the balance of naval power in the Mediterranean had shifted in favour of the Italian Fleet.

Background
The British Eighth Army and the Axis armies in North Africa were engaged in battles resulting from Operation Crusader, which had been fought between 18 November and 4 December. Its aim was to defeat the Afrika Korps and relieve the siege of Tobruk. This had been achieved and Axis forces were conducting a fighting retreat; by 13 December, they were holding a defensive line at Gazala, east of Benghazi. The Axis were desperate to supply their forces, intending to transport stores to Tripoli, their main port in Libya and Benghazi, the port closest to the front line. The island garrison of Malta was under siege and the British wanted to supply their forces on the island.

Prelude

Axis convoys M41 and M42

The Italians were preparing to send M41, a convoy of eight ships, to Africa on 13 December 1941. That morning, their previous supply attempt, two fast cruisers carrying fuel to Tripoli, had failed when both ships were sunk at the Battle of Cape Bon by a force of destroyers en route to Alexandria.

Soon after sailing on 13 December, a group of M41 was attacked by the British submarine  and two ships were sunk; later that day two ships collided and had to return to base, while the distant cover force was sighted by the submarine  and Vittorio Veneto was torpedoed and forced to return to port.

Supermarina the Italian navy high command, rattled by these losses and a report that a British force of two battleships was at sea, ordered the ships to return to await reinforcement but the "force of two battleships" was a decoy operation by the minelayer .

On 16 December, the four-ship Italian convoy, renamed M42, left Taranto, picking up escorts along the way. The close escort was provided by seven destroyers and a torpedo boat; by the time they reached Sicily they were also accompanied by a close cover force, comprising the battleship , three light cruisers and three destroyers.

Allied convoy 
The British planned to run supplies to Malta using the fast merchant ship Breconshire, covered by a force of cruisers and destroyers, while the destroyers from the Cape Bon engagement, would proceed to Alexandria from Malta covered by Force K and Force B from Malta on 15 December.

U-557 was accidentally sunk less than 48 hours later, by the Italian torpedo boat Orione.

On 16 December, the four destroyers of 4th Flotilla (Commander G. Stokes in ) left Malta, covered by Force K (Captain W. G. "Bill" Agnew in ), two cruisers and two destroyers. Thirty Italian warships were escorting four cargo ships. The two British groups were also at sea and steaming toward each other; the opposing forces were likely to cross each other's tracks east of Malta on 18 December.

Battle
On 17 December, an Italian reconnaissance aircraft spotted the British west-bound formation near Sidi Barrani, apparently proceeding from Alexandria to intercept the Italian convoy. The British convoy was shadowed by Axis aeroplanes and attacked during the afternoon but no hits were scored and Agnew and Stokes met the west-bound convoy. By late afternoon the Italian fleet was close by and spotter planes from the battleships had made contact with the British convoy, but the planes misidentified Breconshire as a battleship. At 17:42, the fleets sighted each other; Admiral Angelo Iachino—commander of the Italian forces—moved to intercept to defend his convoy.

Vian also wished to avoid combat, so with the British giving ground and the Italians pursuing with caution, the British were easily able to avoid an engagement. Just after sunset, an air attack on the British ships caused them to return fire with their anti-aircraft guns, allowing the Italian naval force to spot them.

Lacking radar and mindful of their defeat in the night action at the Battle of Cape Matapan, the Italians wished to avoid night combat. The Italians fired for only 15 minutes before disengaging and returning westward to cover convoy M42.  suffered the loss of one midshipman and some damage due to a near-miss either from an  shell, possibly fired by the Italian cruiser  or, as stated by British official reports,  by  shell splinters fired by Andrea Doria and Giulio Cesare, that knocked down wireless aerials and holed the hull, superstructure and ship's boats. British reports tell of other warships punctured by splinters.

Aftermath

Minefield off Tripoli

After dark, Vian to return with Stokes to Alexandria, leaving Agnew to bring Breconshire to Malta, joined by Force B, one cruiser (the other was under repair) and two destroyers. Breconshire and her escorts arrived in Malta at 15:00 on 18 December. At midday, the Italian force also split up and three ships headed for Tripoli, accompanied by the close cover force, while the German supply ship Ankara, headed for Benghazi. The distant cover force remained on station in the Gulf of Sidra until evening, before heading back to base. The British had now realised that the Italians had a convoy in the area; Vian searched for it without success as he returned to Alexandria.

In the afternoon, the position of the Tripoli group was established; a cruiser and two destroyers of Force B and two cruisers and two destroyers of Force K (Captain O'Conor, on the cruiser ) sortied at 18:00 to intercept. Neptune struck four mines and sank, the destroyer  struck a mine and was scuttled the following day. About 830 Allied seamen, many of them New Zealanders from Neptune, lost their lives in the disaster. The Malta Strike Force, which had been such an active threat to Axis shipping to Libya during most of 1941, was much reduced in its effectiveness and was later forced to withdraw to Gibraltar.

Attack on Alexandria

While steaming back to Alexandria along with Vian's force, destroyer  reported an apparently successful depth-charge attack on an unidentified submarine. The only axis submarine off Alexandria was the Italian , which was carrying a group of six Italian frogmen commandos, including Luigi Durand De La Penne, equipped with manned torpedoes. Shortly after Vian's force arrived in Alexandria, on the night of 18 December, the Italians penetrated the harbour and attacked the fleet. This was a strategic change of fortune against the Allies whose effects were felt in the Mediterranean for several months.

Results
Both sides achieved their strategic objectives; the British got supplies through to Malta and the Axis got their ships through to Tripoli and Benghazi, although Benghazi fell to the Eighth Army five days later, on 24 December.

Order of battle
Forces present 17 December 1941

Italy

Admiral Angelo Iachino (on Littorio)
 Close covering force – Vice Admiral Raffaele de Courten (on Duca d'Aosta):
 One battleship: ;
 Distant covering force – Vice Admiral Angelo Parona (on Gorizia):
 10 destroyers: Vincenzo Gioberti, Alfredo Oriani (9a Squadriglia Cacciatorpediniere);
 (10a Squadriglia Cacciatorpediniere);
,  (12a Squadriglia Cacciatorpediniere);
 (16a Squadriglia Cacciatorpediniere).
 Close escort:
 Six destroyers:  (7a Squadriglia Cacciatorpediniere);
,  (14a Squadriglia Cacciatorpediniere);
Lanzerotto Malocello,  (15a Squadriglia Cacciatorpediniere);
 (16a Squadriglia Cacciatorpediniere);
 One torpedo boat: .
 M42 convoy:
 Three motorships: Monginevro, Napoli, Vettor Pisani;
 One freighter: Ankara (German).

Allies
    
 Convoy Escort – Rear-Admiral Philip Vian (on Naiad)
 Convoy
 One fast merchantman: Breconshire
 Force K
 Two light cruisers: , 
 Two destroyers , 
 Force B
 One cruiser: 
 Two destroyers: , 
 4th Destroyer Flotilla

See also
 Second Battle of Sirte

Notes

References
 Bartimeus: East of Malta, West of Suez, Little, Brown and Company, Boston, 1944.
 
 Bragadin, Marc'Antonio: The Italian Navy in World War II, United States Naval Institute, Annapolis, 1957. 
 Brown, David: Warship Losses of World War Two, Naval Institute Press, Annapolis, 1995. 
 G.G.Connell, Mediterranean Maelstrom: HMS Jervis and the 14th Flotilla (1987): ISBN
 
 Eric Groves : Sea Battles in Close-Up Vol II (1993): 
 O'Hara, Vincent P. (2009). Struggle for the Middle Sea: the great navies at war in the Mediterranean theater, 1940-1945. Naval Institute Press. 
 Stephen Roskill : The War at Sea 1939–1945  Vol I (1954): ISBN (none)

External links
 La I Battaglia della Sirte 
 Prima battaglia della Sirte – Plancia di Commando 

Sirte
1941 in Libya
Sirte, First
Sirte
Sirte
Sirte
Sirte, First
Gulf of Sidra
Maritime incidents in Libya
Sirte, First Battle of
Sirte
Sirte
December 1941 events